Rebecca Hunter, sometimes credited as Becky Hunter (born 12 July 1981), is a British actress and singer.

Hunter was born in Northampton, and has a diploma in acting from the London Academy of Music and Dramatic Art. She is best known for playing Melanie Costello on the Channel five soap opera Family Affairs between 2003 and 2005.  Prior to this, she was a member of the pop group allSTARS*, and appeared on the accompanying CITV series STARStreet*. allSTARS* were a pop act aimed predominantly at younger, pre-teen fans, and achieved moderate success in their short career, with four top-twenty UK hit singles - the most notable, a cover of Bucks Fizz's "The Land of Make Believe", reaching #9. Rebecca still remains close friends with Sam, Ashley, Thaila and Sandi.

Her first TV role was on the Disney-produced, BAFTA award-winning CBBC sitcom Microsoap, alongside Paul Terry, Jeff Rawle and Ryan Cartwright, between 1998 and 2000. She has also appeared in My Dad's the Prime Minister and UGetMe. In addition, while a member of allSTARS*, she made an appearance as a guest on Never Mind the Buzzcocks in 2001.

In 2008 Hunter was part of the BBC series Paradise or Bust, chronicling the Tribewanted eco project in Fiji.

Personal life
Hunter was married in October 2007 and lives in Southern California.
She has a son born in June 2010 and a daughter, born in July 2013 with her husband.

External links

1981 births
Alumni of the London Academy of Music and Dramatic Art
English stage actresses
English television actresses
Living people
Allstars (band) members
English women pop singers
21st-century English women singers
21st-century English singers